Astele allanae is a species of sea snail, a marine gastropod mollusk in the family Calliostomatidae. It was named in honour of Joyce Allan.

Some authors place this taxon in the subgenus Astele (Coralastele)

Description
The height of the shell attains 19 mm.

Distribution
This marine species occurs off Australia.

References

External links
 WMSDB: Astele allanae

allanae
Gastropods described in 1930